The Portugal Ahead (PàF) was a conservative political and electoral alliance in Portugal formed by the Social Democratic Party (PPD/PSD) and CDS – People's Party (CDS-PP).

History 
The alliance was formed as the Portugal Alliance (Aliança Portugal) for the 2014 European Parliament election, in which the alliance won 27.7% of the popular vote and 7 of Portugal's 21 seats in the European Parliament, sitting with the European People's Party Group. The alliance was later extended for the 2015 legislative election under the name Portugal Ahead.

In the legislative election on 5 October 2015, the PSD/CDS-PP joint list received 36.9% of the vote and returned 102 seats in the Assembly of the Republic, with the PSD electing 5 deputies on standalone lists in Madeira and Azores.

Although the coalition won the elections, and surprised many analysts and pundits, the left parties together had a majority in Parliament, and opted to negotiate a confidence-and-supply agreement, thus refusing to allow for a second PSD/CDS-PP cabinet. For the first time in Portuguese democracy the Socialist Party, the second most voted political force in the elections, negotiated with the BE, the PCP and the PEV a formation of a new government.

Following the fall of the short-lived 20th Constitutional Government, the "natural" extinction of the coalition was declared on 16 December 2015 by Passos Coelho: "No formal act is necessary to put an end to it".

Election results

Assembly of the Republic

European Parliament
As Portugal Alliance (Aliança Portugal, AP)

Notes

References

External links
Official website (Portuguese)
2014 establishments in Portugal
2015 disestablishments in Portugal
CDS – People's Party
Defunct political party alliances in Portugal
Political parties disestablished in 2015
Political parties established in 2014
Social Democratic Party (Portugal)